is the first studio album by Japanese girl idol group S/mileage. It was released on 8 December 2010 on the label Hachama.

Release 
The album was released in 2 versions: a Regular Edition and a Limited Edition. The limited edition contained an additional DVD.

The album contained 12 tracks on the CD: 7 songs that were originally released as A-sides of 7 physical singles and 5 new songs.

Chart performance 
The album debuted at number 18 in the Japanese Oricon weekly albums chart.

Personnel 
Members of S/mileage:
 Ayaka Wada
 Yūka Maeda
 Kanon Fukuda
 Saki Ogawa

Track listing 

  The tracks 7–24 on the DVD were 18 different TV advertisements for S/mileage's first major-label single "Yume Miru 15".

Charts

References

External links 
 Profile of the album on the official website of Hello! Project
 Profile of the album on the official website of Up-Front Works

Angerme albums
2010 albums
Hachama albums
Japanese-language albums